Shin Jin-won (born 27 September 1974) is retired South Korean footballer and current coach.

Football career
Shin started professional football career with Daejeon Citizen in 1997. He awarded Rookie of the Year of 1997 season.

Honours 
Individual
 K-League Rookie of the Year Award : 1997
 K-League Best XI : 1997

References

 Interview of Shin Jin-won

External links
 

1974 births
Living people
K League 1 players
Daejeon Hana Citizen FC players
Jeonnam Dragons players
Association football midfielders
South Korean footballers